Juanjo Domínguez (October 23, 1951 – February 10, 2019) was an Argentinian classical guitarist and important interpreter of Argentine music, especially tango. In 2005, he was awarded the Konex Award for best instrumental single artist of popular music.

Dominguez was a true virtuoso of the guitar. His double scales, his tremolos in three strings (invented by himself when studying the Memories of the Alhambra (Recuerdos de La Alhambra) of the master Francisco Tárrega (1852-1909) it seemed to him that making the tremolo in a single string limited the sound), his speed comparable to that of an arch instrument and its high level of improvisation make it a unique guitarist. He declared having taken his inspiration from the famous Paraguayan counterpart Agustín Barrios (1885-1944). This was also a remarkable improviser (like all the great musicians of antiquity) and was a «mold» for the construction of his technique.

References

External links
Official Homepage www.juanjodominguez.org
Information at label EPSA Music

Interviews
Interview with Juanjo by Sergio Valor, July 2002

Discography
2002 - Un Placer- with Julio Pane

1951 births
2019 deaths
Argentine classical guitarists
Argentine male guitarists
People from Junín, Buenos Aires
Seven-string guitarists
20th-century classical musicians
20th-century male musicians